Johnny Ma (born Ma Nan,  in Shanghai) is a Chinese-Canadian film director and screenwriter. He is best known for his debut feature film Old Stone, which premiered at the Berlin International Film Festival in 2016. The film won the awards for Best Canadian First Feature Film at the 2016 Toronto International Film Festival, and Best First Feature at the 5th Canadian Screen Awards in 2017. His second feature To Live To Sing premiered at the Director's Fortnight Section of the 2019 Cannes Film Festival.

Early life 
Ma moved from Shanghai to Toronto, Ontario with his family when he was 10 years of age. He attended the University of British Columbia, studying commerce at the behest of his parents, and after working in Shanghai and Wenzhou, decided to pursue a degree in film at Columbia University in New York City in 2010.

Career 
Ma made a number of short films before breaking through to wider success with A Grand Canal in 2013. That film, which premiered at the 2013 Toronto International Film Festival, was named to TIFF's Canada's Top Ten list as one of the ten best Canadian short films of the year, and was a Canadian Screen Award nominee for Best Live Action Short Drama at the 2nd Canadian Screen Awards.

Ma's planned first feature film was Ten Thousand Happiness, for which he won the Beijing International Screenwriting Competition in 2013 and Telefilm Canada's Pitch This! competition in 2014. After difficulty securing financing, he put it on hold and proceeded with Old Stone, a script he was developing as his potential second film.

At the 5th Canadian Screen Awards, Old Stone was also a nominee for Best Picture; Ma was also nominated for Best Original Screenplay.

To Live to Sing was completed in 2019 and premiered at the 2019 Cannes Film Festival Director's Fortnight. It went on to win both Best Film and Best Actress at the 2019 Shanghai International Film Festival.

Filmography 

Ma contributed a short film to the Netflix series Homemade, released in June 2020. Set in San Sebastián del Oeste, Mexico, the short is centred around a letter Ma writes to his mother, voiced over in Mandarin.

References

External links

Living people
Canadian male screenwriters
Chinese emigrants to Canada
Film directors from Shanghai
Film directors from Toronto
Writers from Shanghai
Writers from Toronto
Columbia University School of the Arts alumni
Best First Feature Genie and Canadian Screen Award winners
University of British Columbia alumni
Year of birth missing (living people)
Asian-Canadian filmmakers